Sweden competed at the 2019 World Championships in Athletics in Doha, Qatar, from 27 October to 4 October 2019. 24 athletes were selected to compete for Sweden.

Medalists

Results

Men
Track and road events

Field events

Combined events – Decathlon

Women
Track and road events

Field events

References

Nations at the 2019 World Athletics Championships
World Championships in Athletics
Sweden at the World Championships in Athletics